Max Edward Dinning (August 17, 1933 — March 22, 1986), known by his stage name Mark Dinning was an American pop music singer.

In February 1960, the song "Teen Angel", written by his sister Jean (Eugenia) and her husband Red Surrey, reached number one on the Billboard Hot 100 singles chart. Jean and two of her sisters, Virginia and Lucille, comprised The Dinning Sisters, a popular singing trio in the 1940s. Additionally, Dinning is the uncle of Dean Dinning, bass guitarist for alternative rock band Toad the Wet Sprocket.

Biography
Dinning was born in Manchester, Oklahoma, the youngest of nine children, and was raised on a farm near Nashville, Tennessee, after his family relocated from Kansas. He followed his sisters and pursued a career in country music and, in 1957, record producer Wesley Rose signed him to a recording contract as Mark Dinning.

His recording efforts met with limited success until 1959, when "Teen Angel" became a hit. The lyrics, which told of the death of a teenage girl, were deemed by British radio stations to be too morbid to be aired, but it reached number 37 on the UK Singles Chart. In the U.S., it reached number one on the Billboard charts in early February 1960. It sold over one million copies and was awarded a gold disc. He also was the original artist to record "What Will My Mary Say", a song later popularized by Johnny Mathis in 1963.

Dinning had an alcohol addiction, which restricted his performances, and caused promoters to stop booking him as he faded from public view. Although Dinning never duplicated the success of "Teen Angel", he had three minor hit records in the ensuing years.

Death
Dinning continued performing until his death from a heart attack in Jefferson City, Missouri, at the age of 52.

Discography

Albums
 Teen Angel (MGM 3828, 1960)
 Wanderin′ (MGM 3855, 1960)

Singles

References

External links
 Rockabilly.nl biography
 Notice of Jean Dinning's death in the New York Times
 Producer website for BINGE LP 1012
 

1933 births
1986 deaths
American male pop singers
Hickory Records artists
MGM Records artists
United Artists Records artists
Singers from Tennessee
People from Grant County, Oklahoma
20th-century American singers
20th-century American male singers